Kenneth Kwamina Thompson also known as Ken Thompson (born 24 June 1961) is an orator and well known for his views on issues related to finance and economics. He is a Chartered Accountant by profession and the CEO of Dalex Finance Limited, a non bank financial institution. He has served as heads of venture funds management at Fidelity Equity Fund I and Principal internal audit manager for Barclays Bank, UK. He is also a fellow of the institute of Chartered Accountants in England and Wales.

Education  
He is a graduate from the University of Ghana Business School with honors in Accounting. He is an "Anchorite"- an old student of Tema Secondary School. He subsequently trained with UHY Hacker Young, a firm of chartered Accountants in the United Kingdom.

Career life 
Mr Thompson has extensive experience  as a senior executive in finance and risk management. He serves as a Director on the boards of Dalex Finance, Unique Insurance, Ghana Grid Company (GRIDCo) Ltd. and Reliance Personnel Services. He is a member of the Central Executive Committee of the Ghana National Chamber of Commerce.

Awards 

 In 2016, Mr. Thompson was declared Businessman of the Year and Dalex Finance, Business of the Year by the Ghana Economic Forum (GEF).
 The Ghana National Chamber of Commerce and Industry (GNCCI) also awarded him for Thought Leadership in 2016.
 Under his leadership, Dalex Finance also won the Chartered Institute of Marketing, Ghana (CIMG) Non-Bank Financial Institution (NBFI) of the Year award in 2014.

References 

1961 births
Living people
University of Ghana alumni
Ghanaian bankers
Ghanaian chief executives
Ghanaian business executives